François Gabart (born 23 March 1983 in Saint-Michel-d'Entraygues, France) is a French professional offshore yacht racer who won the 2012-13 Vendée Globe in 78 days 2 hours 16 minutes, setting a new race record. In 2017 he set the speed record for sailing around the globe in 42 days 16 hours 40 minutes and 35 seconds finishing on 17 December. He was sailing singlehanded in the 30 metre Trimaran Macif.

Results 
2018:
2nd of Route du Rhum
2017:
Around the world sailing record single-handed on board trimaran Macif in 42d 16h 40' 35"
2013: 
 Winner of 2012-2013 Vendée Globe on board IMOCA  (new record in 78d 2h 16' 40")
 Winner of doublehanded Fastnet Race, with Michel Desjoyeaux, on board IMOCA Macif
 Winner of doublehanded Artemis Challenge, with Michel Desjoyeaux, on board IMOCA Macif
 Winner of doublehanded Trophée Azimut, with Michel Desjoyeaux, on board IMOCA Macif
 2nd of Défi Azimut on board IMOCA Macif
2012: 
 2nd of Europa Warm'Up on board IMOCA Macif
2011:
 Winner of Transat B to B on board IMOCA Macif
 2nd of Trophée Clairefontaine
 4th of Transat Jacques Vabre, doublehanded, with Sébastien Col on board IMOCA Macif
2010: 
 Singlehanded offshore racing French champion
 2nd of Solitaire du Figaro on board Figaro Macif
2009:
 2nd of Transat Jacques Vabre, with Kito de Pavant, on board IMOCA Groupe Bel
 3rd of Transat BPE (Figaro class)
 13th of Solitaire du Figaro
2008:
 16th of Solitaire du Figaro
2007: 
 Winner of Tour de France à la voile for students
2006: 
 Podium Bizuth (rookies podium) Course des Falaises (Figaro class)
 London-Nice on board 60-ft trimaran Sopra (skipper Antoine Koch)
2005:
 Winner of Tour de France à la voile for students
2003: 
Tornado Junior World Champion
1999: 
Moth France Champion
1997: 
Optimist France Champion

References

External links 
 
 

1983 births
Living people
French male sailors (sport)
Single-handed circumnavigating sailors
2012 Vendee Globe sailors
French Vendee Globe sailors
Vendée Globe finishers
Sportspeople from Charente